is a Japanese professional football manager and former player who is the current manager of Thai League 1 club Buriram United.

Playing career
Ishii was born in Ichihara on 1 February 1967. After graduating from Juntendo University, he joined Japan Soccer League club NTT Kanto in 1989. He played many matches from first season. He moved to Sumitomo Metal (later Kashima Antlers) in 1991. In 1992, Japan Soccer League was folded and founded new league J1 League. In 1993, the club won the 2nd place J1 League and Emperor's Cup. However he could hardly play in the match from 1996. He moved to Avispa Fukuoka in 1998. He retired end of 1998 season.

Coaching career
After retirement, Ishii became a coach for Kashima Antlers in 1999. He served as mainly physical coach. In July 2015, manager Toninho Cerezo was sacked and Ishii became a new manager. He was the Japanese manager of the club for the first time in 21 years since Masakatsu Miyamoto in 1994 (Except caretaker Takashi Sekizuka in 1998 and 1999). In October, the club won the champions 2015 J.League Cup. In 2016, the club won the champions J1 League and qualify for 2016 Club World Cup. He was also elected J.League Manager of the Year. At Club World Cup, the club became the first Asian team to reach the Club World Cup final. In the final, after a 2–2 draw against European champions Real Madrid after 90 minutes, they were beaten 4–2 after extra time. However the club performance is bad in 2017, he was sacked in May 2017.

In November in late in 2017 season, Ishii signed with Omiya Ardija (former NTT Kanto) where he began his playing career. Although he managed 3 matches, the club could not win the matches and was relegated to J2 League. He remained a manager in 2018 season and aimed to return to J1 League. However Ardija finished at 5th place in 2018 season and missed promotion to J1. He resigned at end of the 2018 season.

On 23 December 2019, Ishii was named the head coach of Thai League 1 club Samut Prakan City.

On 1 December 2021, Ishii was appointed head coach of Buriram United. In 2022, the club won the champions 2021–22 Thai League 1 and qualify for 2023–24 AFC Champions League group stage.

Management style

Tactic
Based on 4-4-2 formation, it is characterized by aggressive tactics that use high press and short counter to break through the center. During his time as Omiya Ardija, he made good use of Genki Omae, who had a lack of scoring ability and was unsuccessful in the previous year, leading him to the league's top scorer.

Club statistics

Managerial statistics

Honours

Player
Kashima Antlers
J.League: 1996
Emperor's Cup: 1997
J.League Cup: 1997

Manager
Kashima Antlers
J1 League: 2016
Emperor's Cup: 2016
J.League Cup: 2015
Japanese Super Cup: 2017
FIFA Club World Cup runner-up: 2016

Buriram United
Thai League 1: 2021–22
Thai FA Cup: 2021–22
Thai League Cup: 2021–22

Individual
J.League Manager of the Year: 2016
Thai League 1 Coach of the Year: 2021–22
Thai League 1 Coach of the Month: December 2020, January 2022, November 2022, January 2023, February 2023

References

External links
 
 
 awx.jp

1967 births
Living people
People from Ichihara, Chiba
Juntendo University alumni
Association football people from Chiba Prefecture
Japanese footballers
Japan Soccer League players
J1 League players
Omiya Ardija players
Kashima Antlers players
Avispa Fukuoka players
Japanese football managers
J1 League managers
J2 League managers
Masatada Ishii
Kashima Antlers managers
Omiya Ardija managers
Masatada Ishii
Association football midfielders
Japanese expatriate football managers